EFC may refer to:

Football clubs 
 Eastleigh F.C., England
 Epping Football Club, Australia
 Essendon Football Club, Australia
 Esteghlal F.C., Iran
 Étoile FC, Singapore
 Europa F.C., Gibraltar
 Everton F.C., England

Other uses 
 Eagle Fighting Championship, a MMA promotion company
 Economic and Financial Committee (European Union)
 Edmonton Flying Club, in Canada
 Education Facilities Clearinghouse, a program of the United States Department of Education
 Electronic fee collection or electronic fare collection
 Electronic Frontier Canada, a Canadian civil rights organization
 Emergency Fleet Corporation, now the United States Shipping Board Merchant Fleet Corporation
 Encampment for Citizenship, an American youth organization
 European Fencing Championships
 European Film College, in Ebeltoft, Danmark
 Evangelical Fellowship of Canada, a Canadian church association
 Evangelical Free Church (disambiguation)
 Expansionary fiscal contraction
 Expected Family Contribution, a concept related to college student financial aid in the United States
 Experience Focused Counselling
 Extreme Fighting Championship, a South African mixed martial arts promotion
 Electronic Front Curtain Shutter, or EFCS
 Equivalent firm capacity, a term used in the electricity generation.